Eastern Airways serves the following destinations.

List

References

Eastern Airways